Subsunk is a text adventure game by Firebird released in 1985 for the Amstrad CPC, Commodore 64, and ZX Spectrum home computers.

Plot 
Ed Lines, reporter for the "Seafaring Gazette", is aboard the nuclear submarine Sealion for a routine patrol when the sub is attacked and disabled by a foreign power. The crew are taken into captivity and the sub scuttled - with the hidden journalist still aboard. He must alert headquarters with the news of what has happened and escape the doomed vessel.

Gameplay 
The game was produced with The Quill and includes simple graphics. The player must guide Ed Lines in his attempt to escape the stricken submarine; he must reach the telex room and issue the distress signal "SUBSUNK" to alert the authorities and bring assistance. Meanwhile, the wrecked submarine is filling with water...

It was followed by a sequel, Seabase Delta.

Reception 
ZX Computing: "... a very enjoyable game, mainly because of its sense of humour"
A 1992 Your Sinclair article described it as "possibly the worst of all the games that were around at the time."

References

External links 
 
 
 Subsunk at Lemon 64

1980s interactive fiction
1985 video games
Amstrad CPC games
Commodore 64 games
Telecomsoft games
Video games developed in the United Kingdom
ZX Spectrum games